To All the Boys I've Loved Before is a 2018 American teen romantic comedy film directed by Susan Johnson and written by Sofia Alvarez. The film stars Lana Condor, Noah Centineo, Janel Parrish, Anna Cathcart, Madeleine Arthur, Emilija Baranac, Israel Broussard and John Corbett. The movie is based on Jenny Han's 2014 novel of the same name, and was released by Netflix on August 17, 2018.

It is the first installment in the To All the Boys film series and followed by two sequels, To All the Boys: P.S. I Still Love You, released on February 12, 2020, and To All the Boys: Always and Forever on February 12, 2021. It received generally favorable reviews from critics, who praised the cast.

Plot
Shy high school junior Lara Jean Covey writes letters to boys she feels an intense passion for, before locking the letters away in her closet. Her most recent is to her childhood friend Josh, who was dating her older sister Margot until Margot broke up with him before she went off to college. Lara Jean always had a crush on Josh but decides it would not be okay to date him. One night, Lara Jean falls asleep on the couch while hanging out with her little sister, Kitty, who sneaks into her room and finds her collection of letters. The following Monday at school, Lara Jean is confronted by a former crush, Peter Kavinsky. He received the letter she had written him, causing her to faint. After waking up, she sees Josh approaching with his letter, and in a moment of panic, Lara Jean kisses Peter to throw Josh off before running away.

Lara Jean then encounters another recipient of a letter, Lucas, who is gay, as she begins to realize that all the letters have been mailed out. She later left her house to avoid both Josh and Peter, but the latter appears at her favorite diner. She explains that the kiss was merely to dissuade Josh. Peter is surprisingly okay with this, and proposes that he and Lara Jean fake date to make his ex-girlfriend (Lara Jean's ex-best friend and nemesis) Gen jealous. She agrees, and the next few months go by with the whole school, along with their respective friends and families, believing they are dating.

When Peter finds that Gen is actually jealous, he is himself conflicted. At the same time, Lara Jean finds herself jealous. On the school ski trip, Lara Jean and Peter confront each other about their true feelings, ending up kissing while alone in a hot tub. At the end of the trip, Gen tells Lara Jean that Peter spent the night in her room after the kiss, taunting Lara Jean with her scrunchie Peter let her take, Lara Jean's favorite. Furious, she breaks up with Peter and storms home, where she finds Margot has returned from college. Peter then comes, hoping to explain that nothing happened between him and Gen, but Josh arrives as well. Margot overhears everything, and is upset when she learns of Lara Jean's former feelings for Josh. Things are worsened when, after Lara Jean asks Peter to leave, she sees that a seemingly pornographic video of her and Peter in the hot tub has been put up on Instagram.

Lara Jean asks Margot for help, who calms and comforts her. Kitty then reveals she sent the letters. Lara Jean is enraged, Margot calms her down, and makes her realize she may have wanted to send them but was too afraid to, and the sisters forgive each other before getting Instagram to take down the video. After Christmas break, Lara Jean discovers that everyone at school knows about the video. Peter tells everyone that nothing happened. When Lara Jean confronts Gen about it, she admits she tried to sabotage their relationship as she felt betrayed that Lara Jean kissed Peter during spin the bottle four years ago. Talking with her dad, she reevaluates her relationships, becoming friends with Josh again. When she hesitates to tell Peter about her real feelings, Kitty shows her notes that he wrote during their 'relationship'. Lara Jean goes to see Peter, and he tells her that he is in love with her. They kiss before walking off together.

In a mid-credits scene, John Ambrose McClaren, one of the five recipients of Lara Jean's letters, arrives at her door with flowers in hand.

Cast and characters

 Lana Condor as Lara Jean
 Isabelle Beech as young Lara Jean
 Noah Centineo as Peter, one of Lara Jean's love letter recipients
 Hunter Dillon as young Peter
 Janel Parrish as Margot, Lara Jean's older sister and Josh's ex-girlfriend
 Anna Cathcart as Kitty, Lara Jean's younger sister
 Andrew Bachelor as Greg, Peter's best friend
 Trezzo Mahoro as Lucas, a friend of Lara Jean's and one of her former crushes
 Madeleine Arthur as Christine, Genevieve's cousin and Lara Jean's best friend
 Emilija Baranac as Gen, Peter's ex-girlfriend and Lara Jean's former best friend in middle school
 Rhys Fleming as young Gen
 Israel Broussard as Josh, Margot's ex-boyfriend and one of Lara Jean's former loves
 Christian Michael Cooper as young Josh
 John Corbett as Dr. Covey, Lara Jean's widowed father

 Kelcey Mawema as Emily, a friend of Gen's
 Julia Benson as Ms. Kavinsky, Peter's mother
 Joey Pacheco as Owen, Peter's younger brother
 Edward Kewin as Kenny, one of Lara Jean's love letter recipients
 Jordan Burtchett as John Ambrose, one of Lara Jean's love letter recipients
 Pavel Piddocke as young John
 June R. Wilde as Joan, a waitress at the diner Lara Jean hangs out in

Production

Development
In June 2014, author Jenny Han's New York Times Best Selling young adult romance novel To All the Boys I've Loved Before was optioned by Will Smith and James Lassiter's production company Overbrook Entertainment. At that time, writer Annie Neal had been hired to adapt the book for the screen. On July 5, 2017, production began in Vancouver, British Columbia. It was announced later that month that Lana Condor had been cast in the leading role of Lara Jean Song Covey, with Susan Johnson directing from a screenplay by Sofia Alvarez. It was also reported that John Corbett, Janel Parrish, Anna Cathcart, Noah Centineo, Israel Broussard, and Andrew Bachelor had joined the cast of the film.

This is the first film released by AwesomenessTV after its acquisition by Viacom.

Filming
Principal photography began in Vancouver, British Columbia and the surrounding areas on July 5, 2017. Parts of the film were shot in Portland, Oregon, which is also the setting for the film. Scenes at Lara Jean's high school were filmed at Point Grey Secondary School. Production concluded on August 4, 2017.

Release
In March 2018, Netflix acquired distribution rights to the film, and released it on August 17, 2018.

Reception
The website's critical consensus reads, "To All the Boys I've Loved Before plays by the teen rom-com rules, but relatable characters and a thoroughly charming cast more than make up for a lack of surprises." On Metacritic, the film has a weighted average score of 64 out of 100, based on reviews from 12 critics, indicating "generally favorable reviews".

Linda Holmes for NPR writes, "The film is precisely what it should be: pleasing and clever, comforting and fun and romantic. Just right for your Friday night, your Saturday afternoon, and many lazy layabout days to come."

Alexis Gunderson for Paste Magazine writes, "To All the Boys I've Loved Before, the teen scene's newest runaway hit, is a flat-out excellent film. It is not excellent "for a teen flick." It is not excellent "for a romantic comedy." It is excellent for a film."

Rachel Syme for The New Republic praises, "As people re-watch the film in coming months, however, I hope that Lara Jean's name will start trending as much as Peter Kavinsky's has. Centineo performs a type of compassionate male energy that is in short supply in movies at the moment, but Lana Condor is undeniably TATBILB's star. When the film opens, she is daydreaming, picturing herself in a crimson gown on a heath, as the wind blows across her face. In those moments, before the film snaps back into suburbia, Condor is fully convincing as the heroine of a serious period piece. Now, that is all I want to see."

The film has been criticized on social media for the casting of white male actors in the roles of four of the five love interests for Lara Jean. Speaking with IndieWire, author Jenny Han stated, "I understand the frustration and I share that frustration of wanting to see more Asian-American men in media." Han added, "For [To All the Boys I've Loved Before], all I can say is this is the story that I wrote."

A scene in the film featured Kitty offering Peter a bottle of Yakult led to a spike in sales for the drink in parts of the world.

Sequels

In August 2018, author of the source novel Jenny Han said of a sequel film, which would adapt the second book in the series:

In November 2018, it was reported that Netflix and Paramount's Awesomeness Films were in discussions to produce a sequel to the film, and Netflix announced the development of a sequel film, featuring Condor and Centineo, in December 2018.

Filming for the sequel began on March 27, 2019 and wrapped on May 8. All the cast from the previous film return except Israel Broussard, with newcomer Jordan Fisher portraying Lara Jean's love interest, John Ambrose McClaren.

A third film based on the third book in the series started filming on July 15, 2019, two months after production on the second film wrapped.

Spin-off television series

On March 31, 2021, it was reported that a spin-off series was in early development, starring Anna Cathcart. On October 18, 2021, it was announced that Netflix gave production a series order consisting ten episodes and titled as XO, Kitty.

References

External links
 
 

2018 romantic comedy films
2010s teen comedy films
2010s teen romance films
2018 films
American romantic comedy films
American teen comedy films
American teen romance films
Awesomeness Films films
Films based on American novels
Films based on romance novels
Films based on young adult literature
Films set in Portland, Oregon
Films shot in Vancouver
Overbrook Entertainment films
English-language Netflix original films
Films shot in Portland, Oregon
2010s English-language films
2010s American films